Italy competed at the 1993 World Championships in Athletics in Stuttgart, Germany from 13 to 22 August 1993.

Finalists
Italy national athletics team ranked 11th (with 10 finalists) in the IAAF placing table. Rank obtained by assigning eight points in the first place and so on to the eight finalists.

Results
Italy participated with 44 athletes by winning four medals.

Men (29)

Women (15)

References

External links
4TH IAAF WORLD CHAMPIONSHIPS IN ATHLETICS

Nations at the 1993 World Championships in Athletics
World Championships in Athletics
Italy at the World Championships in Athletics